WiiConnect24 was a feature of the Nintendo Wi-Fi Connection for the Wii console. It was first announced at Electronic Entertainment Expo (E3) in mid-2006 by Nintendo. It enabled the user to remain connected to the Internet while the console was on standby. For example, a friend could send messages to another player's town without the other player being present in the game in Animal Crossing: City Folk.

On June 27, 2013, WiiConnect24 service features were globally terminated. Consequently, the Wii channels that required it, online data exchange via Wii Message Board, and passive online features for certain games (the latter two of which made use of 16-digit Wii Friend Codes) have all been rendered unusable.

The Wii U does not officially support WiiConnect24, so most preloaded and downloadable Wii channels were unavailable on the Wii U's Wii Mode menu and Wii Shop Channel respectively, even prior to WiiConnect24's termination. On the discontinuation date, the defunct downloadable Wii channels were removed from the Wii Shop Channel.

WiiConnect24 has been succeeded by SpotPass, a different trademark name for similar content-pushing functions that the Nintendo Network service can perform for the newer Nintendo 3DS and Wii U consoles.

In 2015, a fan-made service called RiiConnect24 went live as a replacement for WiiConnect24, and aims to bring back WiiConnect24 to those who have a homebrewed Wii console. As of now, the service offers online access to all of the Wii's Channels released in North America, as well as sending messages to other users in the Wii Message Board.

Service

WiiConnect24 was used to receive content such as Wii Message Board messages sent from other Wii consoles, Miis, emails, updated channel and game content, and notifications of software updates. If the Standby Connect mode of WiiConnect24 is enabled, this content can also be received when the Wii is left in standby mode. While running in standby mode with Standby Connection enabled, the Wii uses about 9.6 watts, compared to 1.3 watts without WiiConnect24.

WiiConnect24 can still be turned on or off via the setup interface. If it is on, the user is allowed to enable or disable Standby Connect mode. While the console is in standby, the power LED indicates the current status of the standby connection; red indicating Standby Connect is off, yellow indicating Standby Connect mode is on. If the power button on the console is pressed and held down for three to four seconds, the Wii goes into standby mode with Standby Connect off. If the Wii is cut off from power and power is later restored, it goes into standby mode with Standby Connect mode off, and WiiConnect24 will not operate until the console is turned on.

The Wii's Optical Drive will glow a neon-blue colour when Wii Message Board data has been received through WiiConnect24 in Standby Connect mode and, with firmware 3.0 and above, it will briefly flash when the console is turned on. The brightness level of this blue light can be changed via the Setup Interface with the options of Bright, Dim, or Off.

The flowing light on the Wii is timed with the bird call of the Japanese bush warbler.

When game messages are received with pictures, the player can view and customise them in the Photo Channel. The player would also be able to send them to other Wii consoles that are sent when you register them. The player could also opt out of receiving messages from Nintendo if they chose to.

Functionality
During an interview with the Japanese newspaper Nikkei Business Publications, Nintendo's CEO, Satoru Iwata, revealed that the WiiConnect24 could be used for the downloading of demos for the Nintendo DS (this was later revealed to be the Nintendo Channel).

According to Nintendo's European micro-site for the Wii, WiiConnect24 can be used to send SMS messages "to family members that are out and about", and exchange pictures and messages with other Wii users.

Channels
The following were Wii Menu channels that used WiiConnect24 that were released in North America:

The Forecast and News channels required that both WiiConnect24 and Standby Connection were enabled to work; if WiiConnect24 was enabled and Standby Connection was disabled, the channels would give an error message upon launch and return the user to the Wii Menu. The reason for this requirement is due to the fact that they had to download data that was relatively up to date.

Problems
The initial firmware update caused some parts of the console to be inaccessible to a small portion of people who purchased the Wii at launch. Those Wii consoles received constant error codes. For those users it was necessary to contact Nintendo's customer service to replace or repair the console.

In some countries, trying to connect to WiiConnect24 displays a screen stating that the service "is currently not being offered". This can be circumvented by selecting a different country as a location. It is currently unknown what the actual availability map of the service is.

The PAL versions of the Wii connected with RGB SCART cables continue to send a SCART switching signal when the Wii is in WiiConnect24 standby mode. This occurs with both official Nintendo RGB SCART cables, and any third party RGB SCART cables that carry the SCART switching signal. This problem can be alleviated by disabling standby mode, but leaving WiiConnect24 running.

When the disc slot light glows, it can cause the Wii to get hot in standby mode. This is because the fan is turned off while the console is also in standby mode.

Closure 
By June 27, 2013, Nintendo had discontinued almost all WiiConnect24 services. The Wii Shop Channel closed on January 30, 2019, and remaining video-on-demand services on Wii also ended on that date.

See also
 Wii
 Nintendo Wi-Fi Connection
 List of Wii games using WiiConnect24
 List of Wii Wi-Fi Connection games
 PlayStation Network
 Xbox Live

References

Online video game services
Products and services discontinued in 2013
Wii